Touch is a 101 episode anime television series that aired on Fuji TV in Japan from March 24, 1985, until March 22, 1987. It was one of the highest-rated anime television shows ever in Japan, with episodes consistently rated 30+ percentage points during parts of its run. In a 2005 poll by TV Asahi of the top 100 animated television series, Touch was ranked ninth.

The series tells the story of twins, Tatsuya and Katsuya Uesugi, who live next door to Minami Asakura. Their parents built a playhouse between their properties so the children could play together there. As they grew older, they noticed that one of them (Minami) was a girl. The story picks up when they are in junior high school just before they graduate and move to high school.

Episode list

Staff
Planning: Tadashi Oka (Fuji TV) & Yoshirō Kataoka (ADK), in cooperation with Kiyoshi Usami (OB Planning)
Executive Producers: Yoshinobu Nakao (Fuji TV), Chihiro Kameyama (Fuji TV), Masashi Fujihara, Shigetsugu Tsuiki
Art Director: Shichirō Kobayashi
Backgrounds: Kobayashi Production
Photography: Studio Gallop
Music Director: Fusanobu Fujiyama
Music Work: Zack Promotion
Music: Hiroaki Serizawa
Assistant Animation Director: Minoru Maeda
Series Bungei Organization: Yumiko Takaboshi, Satoshi Namiki
Title Animation: Gisaburō Sugii, Minoru Maeda, Akinori Nagaoka
Animation Director: Tsuneo Maeda
Series Director: Hiroko Tokita
Assistant Director: Gisaburō Sugii
Production Assistance: Studio Junio, Studio Gallop, Kitty Films
Production: Toho, Group TAC, ADK

Theme songs
Opening
Episodes 1-27: Touch, by Yoshimi Iwasaki
Episodes 28-56: Ai ga Hitoribotchi, by Yoshimi Iwasaki
Episodes 57-79: Che! Che! Che!, by Yoshimi Iwasaki
Episodes 80-93: Hitoribotchi no Duet, by Yumekojo
Episodes 94-101: Jōnetsu Monogatari, by Yoshimi Iwasaki
Ending
Episodes 1-27: Kimi ga Inakereba, by Yoshimi Iwasaki
Episodes 28-62: Seishun, by Yoshimi Iwasaki
Episodes 63-79: Yakusoku, by Yoshimi Iwasaki
Episodes 80-101: Kimi wo Tobashita Gogo, by Yumekojo

References

Touch